The Sack–Schamel equation describes the nonlinear evolution of the cold ion fluid in a two-component plasma under the influence of a self-organized electric field. It is a partial differential equation of second order in time and space formulated in Lagrangian coordinates. The dynamics described by the equation take place on an ionic time scale, which allows electrons to be treated as if they were in equilibrium and described by an isothermal Boltzmann distribution. Supplemented by suitable boundary conditions, it describes the entire configuration space of possible events the ion fluid is capable of, both globally and locally.

The equation
The Sack–Schamel equation is in its simplest form, namely for isothermal electrons, given by

 is therein the specific volume of the ion fluid,  the Lagrangian mass variable and t the time (see the following text).

Derivation and application
We treat, as an example, the plasma expansion into vacuum, i.e. a plasma that  is confined initially in a half-space and is released at t=0  to occupy in course of time the second half.

Both species are thereby coupled through the self-organized electric field , which satisfies Poisson's equation, . Supplemented by suitable initial and boundary conditions (b.c.s), they represent a self-consistent, intrinsically closed set of equations that represent the laminar ion flow in its full pattern on the ion time scale.

Figs. 1a, 1b show an example of a typical evolution. Fig. 1a shows the ion density in x-space for different discrete times, Fig. 1b a small section of the density front.

Most notable is the appearance of a spiky ion front associated with the collapse of density at a certain point in space-time . Here, the quantity  becomes zero. This event is known as "wave breaking" by analogy with a similar phenomenon that occurs with water waves approaching a beach.

This result is obtained by a Lagrange numerical scheme, in which the Euler coordinates  are replaced by Lagrange coordinates , and by so-called open b.c.s, which are formulated by differential equations of the  first order.

In the second step the definition of the mass variable was used which is constant along the trajectory of a fluid element: . Hence . The velocity of a fluid element coincides with the local fluid velocity.

Replacing  by  we get from Poisson's equation: . Hence . Finally, replacing  in the  expression we get the desired equation:. Further details on this transition from one to the other coordinate system can be found in. 
Physically V represents the specific volume. It is equivalent with the Jacobian J of the transformation from Eulerian to Lagrangian coordinates since it holds

Wave-breaking solution
An analytical, global solution of the Sack–Schamel equation is generally not available. The same holds for the plasma expansion problem. This means that the data  for the collapse cannot be predicted, but have to be taken from the numerical solution. Nonetheless, it is possible, locally in space and time, to obtain a solution to the equation. This is presented in detail in Sect.6 "Theory of bunching and wave breaking in ion dynamics" of. The solution can be found in equation (6.37) and reads for small  and t

 

This means that the density n diverges at  when we return to the original Lagrangian variables.

It is easily seen that the slope of the velocity, diverges as well when . In the final collapse phase, the Sack–Schamel equation transits into the quasi-neutral scalar wave equation:  and the ion dynamics obeys Euler's simple wave equation: .

Generalization
A generalization is achieved by allowing different equations of state for the electrons. Assuming a polytropic equation of state,  or with :  where  refers to isothermal electrons, we get (see again Sect. 6 of ):

 

The limitation of  results from the demand that at infinity the electron density should vanish (for the expansion into vacuum problem).
"Constraints on the electron dynamics".

Fast Ion Bunching 
These results are in two respects remarkable. The collapse, which could be resolved analytically by the Sack–Schamel equation, signalizes through its singularity the absence of real physics. A real plasma can continue in at least two ways.
Either it enters into the kinetic collsionless Vlasov regime  and develops multi-streaming and folding effects in phase space  or  it experiences dissipation (e.g. through Navier-Stokes viscosity in the momentum equation
) which controls furtheron the evolution in the subsequent phase.
As a consequence the ion density peak saturates and continues its acceleration into vacuum maintaining its spiky nature. This phenomenon of fast ion bunching being recognized by its spiky fast ion front has received immense attention in the recent past in several fields. High-energy ion jets are of importance and promising in applications such as in the laser-plasma interaction, in the laser irradiation of solid targets, being also referred to as target normal sheath acceleration, in future plasma based particle accelerators and radiation sources (e.g. for tumor therapy) and in space plasmas.
Fast ion bunches are hence a relic of wave breaking that is analytically completely described by the Sack–Schamel equation. (For more details especially about the spiky nature of the fast ion front in case of dissipation see http://www.hans-schamel.de or the original papers ). An article in which the Sack-Schamel's wave breaking mechanism is mentioned as the origin of a peak ion front was published e.g. by Beck and Pantellini (2009).

Finally, the notability of the Sack–Schamel equation is clarified through a recently published  molecular dynamics simulation. In the early phase of the  plasma expansion a distinct ion peak could be observed, emphasizing the importance of the wave breaking scenario as predicted by the equation.

References

External links
 www.hans-schamel.de further information by Hans Schamel

Partial differential equations
Laser applications
Plasma physics